Boronia ovata is a plant in the citrus family, Rutaceae and is endemic to the south-west of Western Australia. It is an open shrub with simple, egg-shaped leaves and pink to mauve four-petalled flowers. It is found in the Darling Range near Perth.

Description
The stigma is minute. Flowering occurs from September to November.<ref name="FoA">{{cite web |last1=Duretto |first1=Marco F. |last2=Wilson |first2=Paul G. |last3=Ladiges |first3=Pauline Y. |title=Boronia ovata |url=https://profiles.ala.org.au/opus/foa/profile/Boronia%20ovata |publisher=Flora of Australia: Australian Biological Resources Study, Department of the Environment and Energy, Canberra |accessdate=7 April 2019}}</ref>

Taxonomy and namingBoronia ovata was first formally described in 1841 by John Lindley and the description was published in Edwards's Botanical Register. The specific epithet (ovata) is a Latin word meaning "egg-shaped".

 Distribution and habitat
This boronia grows in eucalypt woodland in the Darling Range between New Norica and Boddington in the Avon Wheatbelt, Jarrah Forest and Swan Coastal Plain biogeographic regions.

ConservationBoronia ovata'' is classified as "not threatened" by the Western Australian Government Department of Parks and Wildlife.

References

ovata
Flora of Western Australia
Plants described in 1841
Taxa named by John Lindley